Tacy sami is a song by Polish band Lady Pank. Tacy sami was written by Jacek Skubikowski, and music was created by Jan Borysewicz.

The song had two versions: one released in 1998, and the second in unknown year.

The song was recorded in 1988.

The song was released in the album Tacy sami in 1988 by Polskie Nagrania.

Musicians
Jan Borysewicz - guitar
Janusz Panasewicz - vocal
Edmunt Stasiak - guitar
Paweł Mścisławski - guitar
Wiesław Gola - percussion
Jerzy Suchocki - keyboard

See also
Tacy sami - album

References

External links
Song's text

Polish songs
Polish-language songs
1988 songs